Palm Island(s) may refer to:

Queensland
 Palm Island, Queensland, Australia, the locality in Queensland (consisting of the 13 islands of the Palm Island group, aka Greater Palm group)
 Great Palm Island, Queensland, Australia, the island most often referred to as Palm Island
Aboriginal Shire of Palm Island, the council governing Great Palm Island and 11 other islands in the group
Palm Island Aboriginal Settlement, an Aboriginal reserve on Great Palm Island, Queensland, 1914–1975
Palm Island Airport, on Great Palm Island, Queensland

Others
 Palm Island, Aruba, a private island in the Caribbean Sea, part of the Netherlands
 Palm Island, Grenadines, an island in the Grenadines
 Palm Island, Lebanon, an island in Lebanon, also known as Rabbits Island
 Palm Island, Paracel Islands, an island in Paracel Islands in the South China Sea
 Palm Island (Miami Beach), Florida, United States
 Palm Island, a resort on Don Pedro Island, Charlotte County, Florida, United States
 Palm Islands, artificial islands in Dubai

See also
Palm Island mystery disease, a disease affecting Aboriginal people on Great Palm Island in 1979
Palm Island riot, following a death in custody in 2004 on Great Palm Island
Palm Islands Nature Reserve, Lebanon